"Heartbreaker" is a song written by Carole Bayer Sager and David Wolfert, and recorded by American entertainer Dolly Parton. It was released in July 1978 as the first single and title track from the album Heartbreaker. The song topped the U.S. country singles chart, for three consecutive weeks, in mid-1978. "Heartbreaker" also peaked at #37 on the Billboard Hot 100 and #12 on the Easy Listening chart.

Chart performance
Weekly

Year-End

References

External links

Heartbreaker lyrics at Dolly Parton On-Line

1978 singles
Dolly Parton songs
Songs written by Carole Bayer Sager
RCA Records singles
1978 songs
Song recordings produced by Gary Klein (producer)